Jovan Blagojevic (born April 6, 1991) is a Canadian soccer player.

Career

College and youth
Blagojevic played four years of college soccer at Simon Fraser University between 2011 and 2014.

Professional
On January 20, 2015, Blagojevic was selected 54th overall in the 2015 MLS SuperDraft by Vancouver Whitecaps FC. On February 24, 2015, he signed with Vancouver's USL side Whitecaps FC 2. His first game was in a 2–2 draw on May 17, 2015 against Oklahoma City Energy FC. He was not on the roster in 2016.

References

1991 births
Living people
Footballers from Belgrade
People from Coquitlam
Canadian soccer players
Canadian people of Serbian descent
Simon Fraser Clan men's soccer players
Whitecaps FC 2 players
Association football forwards
Vancouver Whitecaps FC draft picks
USL Championship players